Inkling is an American company based in San Francisco, California. Inkling markets tools for businesses to create, manage, and distribute digital content. Inkling has been used by companies such as Taco Bell, McDonald's, and Verizon.

History 
Matt MacInnis, Josh Forman, and Robert Cromwell founded Inkling in August 2009. MacInnis became the CEO, with Forman as the VP, Product and Cromwell as the VP, Engineering. In August 2010, the company launched its iPad app and announced partnerships with John Wiley & Sons, McGraw-Hill, and Wolters Kluwer.

The company initially focused on creating interactive e-book versions of existing textbooks. In 2011, it added other types of general-interest non-fiction titles, such as travel guides and cookbooks.

In early 2014, Inkling pivoted from a business-to-consumer model to a business-to-business model. After that, the majority of their revenue came from licensing fees under the Software as a Service model. Inkling stopped producing e-books, but has continued to sell its existing e-books through its online bookstore, publishers’ online stores, and the Apple App Store.

In August 2014, Inkling was named #105 on the Inc. 500 list of the fastest-growing companies.

On December 13, 2016, Inkling announced a $25 million round of funding. Sapphire Ventures led the round, with participation from Sequoia Capital and Tenaya Capital.

On November 26, 2018, Inkling appointed Jeff Carr as their new CEO.

See also 
 Apple Books and iBooks Author
 Boundless
 Kno
 Samsung
 Pronoun

References

External links 

Ebook suppliers
American companies established in 2009
Publishing companies established in 2009
Companies based in San Francisco
Educational technology companies of the United States
Software companies based in California
Software companies of the United States